Bol is a city in Chad, the capital of the Lac Region. The town is served by Bol Airport , which has a paved runway. Bol was on the shores of Lake Chad, before it shrunk. Bol is 152 km to the north of the capital of Chad, N'Djamena.

Demographics

References

External links
 Link to picture on UNESCO site
 Some statistics

Populated places in Chad
Lac Region